Deszno  is a village in the administrative district of Gmina Nagłowice, within Jędrzejów County, Świętokrzyskie Voivodeship, in south-central Poland.

Notable people
 Wincenty Pstrowski (1904-1948) miner awarded for his exceptional productivity

References

Villages in Jędrzejów County